In mathematics, the double factorial of a number , denoted by , is the product of all the integers from 1 up to  that have the same parity (odd or even) as . That is,

For even , the double factorial is

and for odd  it is

For example, . The zero double factorial  as an empty product.

The sequence of double factorials for even  =  starts as
 1, 2, 8, 48, 384, 3840, 46080, 645120,... 
The sequence of double factorials for odd  =  starts as
 1, 3, 15, 105, 945, 10395, 135135,... 

The term odd factorial is sometimes used for the double factorial of an odd number.

History and usage
In a 1902 paper, the physicist Arthur Schuster wrote:

 states that the double factorial was originally introduced in order to simplify the expression of certain trigonometric integrals that arise in the derivation of the Wallis product. Double factorials also arise in expressing the volume of a hypersphere, and they have many applications in enumerative combinatorics. They occur in Student's -distribution (1908), though Gosset did not use the double exclamation point notation.

Relation to the factorial
Because the double factorial only involves about half the factors of the ordinary factorial, its value is not substantially larger than the square root of the factorial , and it is much smaller than the iterated factorial .

The factorial of a non-zero  may be written as the product of two double factorials:

and therefore

where the denominator cancels the unwanted factors in the numerator.  (The last form also applies when .)

Applications in enumerative combinatorics

Double factorials are motivated by the fact that they occur frequently in enumerative combinatorics and other settings. For instance,  for odd values of  counts
Perfect matchings of the complete graph  for odd . In such a graph, any single vertex v has  possible choices of vertex that it can be matched to, and once this choice is made the remaining problem is one of selecting a perfect matching in a complete graph with two fewer vertices. For instance, a complete graph with four vertices a, b, c, and d has three perfect matchings: ab and cd, ac and bd, and ad and bc. Perfect matchings may be described in several other equivalent ways, including involutions without fixed points on a set of  items (permutations in which each cycle is a pair) or chord diagrams (sets of chords of a set of  points evenly spaced on a circle such that each point is the endpoint of exactly one chord, also called Brauer diagrams). The numbers of matchings in complete graphs, without constraining the matchings to be perfect, are instead given by the telephone numbers, which may be expressed as a summation involving double factorials.
Stirling permutations, permutations of the multiset of numbers  in which each pair of equal numbers is separated only by larger numbers, where . From this recursive construction, a proof that the Stirling permutations are counted by the double permutations follows by induction. Alternatively, instead of the restriction that values between a pair may be larger than it, one may also consider the permutations of this multiset in which the first copies of each pair appear in sorted order; such a permutation defines a matching on the  positions of the permutation, so again the number of permutations may be counted by the double permutations.
Heap-ordered trees, trees with  nodes labeled , such that the root of the tree has label 0, each other node has a larger label than its parent, and such that the children of each node have a fixed ordering. An Euler tour of the tree (with doubled edges) gives a Stirling permutation, and every Stirling permutation represents a tree in this way.
Unrooted binary trees with  labeled leaves. Each such tree may be formed from a tree with one fewer leaf, by subdividing one of the  tree edges and making the new vertex be the parent of a new leaf.
Rooted binary trees with  labeled leaves. This case is similar to the unrooted case, but the number of edges that can be subdivided is even, and in addition to subdividing an edge it is possible to add a node to a tree with one fewer leaf by adding a new root whose two children are the smaller tree and the new leaf.

 and  list several additional objects with the same counting sequence, including "trapezoidal words" (numerals in a mixed radix system with increasing odd radixes), height-labeled Dyck paths, height-labeled ordered trees, "overhang paths", and certain vectors describing the lowest-numbered leaf descendant of each node in a rooted binary tree.

The even double factorials give the numbers of elements of the hyperoctahedral groups (signed permutations or symmetries of a hypercube)

Asymptotics
Stirling's approximation for the factorial can be used to derive an asymptotic equivalent for the double factorial.  In particular, since  one has as  tends to infinity that

Extensions

Negative arguments
The ordinary factorial, when extended to the gamma function, has a pole at each negative integer, preventing the factorial from being defined at these numbers. However, the double factorial of odd numbers may be extended to any negative odd integer argument by inverting its recurrence relation

to give

Using this inverted recurrence, (−1)!! = 1, (−3)!! = −1, and (−5)!! = ; negative odd numbers with greater magnitude have fractional double factorials.  In particular, when  is an odd number, this gives

Complex arguments

The final expression is defined for all complex numbers except the negative even integers and satisfies  everywhere it is defined.  As with the gamma function that extends the ordinary factorial function, this double factorial function is logarithmically convex in the sense of the Bohr–Mollerup theorem.

Instead, it implies the following alternative:

with the value for 0!! in this case being
 .

Using this formula as the definition, the volume of an -dimensional hypersphere of radius  can be expressed as

Additional identities

Using instead the extension of the double factorial of odd numbers to complex numbers, the formula is

Double factorials can also be used to evaluate integrals of more complicated trigonometric polynomials.

Double factorials of odd numbers are related to the gamma function by the identity:

Some additional identities involving double factorials of odd numbers are:

An approximation for the ratio of the double factorial of two consecutive integers is

This approximation gets more accurate as  increases, which can be seen as a result of the  Wallis Integral.

Generalizations

Definitions

In the same way that the double factorial generalizes the notion of the single factorial, the following definition of the integer-valued multiple factorial functions (multifactorials), or -factorial functions, extends the notion of the double factorial function for :

Alternative extension of the multifactorial
Alternatively, the multifactorial  can be extended to most real and complex numbers  by noting that when  is one more than a positive multiple of the positive integer  then

This last expression is defined much more broadly than the original. However, it is defined for and satisfies  for all other complex numbers . This definition is consistent with the earlier definition only for those integers  satisfying .

In addition to extending  to most complex numbers , this definition has the feature of working for all positive real values of . Furthermore, when , this definition is mathematically equivalent to the  function, described above. Also, when , this definition is mathematically equivalent to the alternative extension of the double factorial.

Generalized Stirling numbers expanding the multifactorial functions

These generalized -factorial coefficients then generate the distinct symbolic polynomial products defining the multiple factorial, or -factorial functions, as

The generalized -factorial polynomials,  where , which generalize the Stirling convolution polynomials from the single factorial case to the multifactorial cases, are defined by

These polynomials have a particularly nice closed-form ordinary generating function given by

Exact finite sums involving multiple factorial functions

Then we can expand the next single finite sums involving the multifactorial, or -factorial functions, in terms of the Pochhammer symbol and the generalized, rational-valued binomial coefficients as

and moreover, we similarly have double sum expansions of these functions given by

Similar identities can be obtained via context-free grammars.

References

Integer sequences
Enumerative combinatorics
Factorial and binomial topics

fr:Analogues de la factorielle#Multifactorielles